Colin Huang or Huang Zheng (born January 1, 1980) is a Chinese billionaire businessman and philanthropist. He is the founder and former CEO of the e-commerce company Pinduoduo, which is now the largest agriculture platform in China. Huang is also the owner of at least three other limited liability Cayman companies, including Pinduoduo.

Early life and education
Huang was born in 1980 in the outskirts of Hangzhou, Zhejiang. His parents were middle-class factory workers. He attended Hangzhou Foreign Language School.

At the age of 18, Huang began studying computer science at Chu Kuchen Honors College of Zhejiang University. During his freshman year, he was selected as a fellow at the Melton Foundation. Huang graduated with a master's degree in computer science from the University of Wisconsin in 2004.

Business career

Early career 
Huang interned at Google and Microsoft. He became an engineer with Google in 2004. In 2006, he returned to China with Kaai-fu Lee to expand Google services in China.

After resigning from Google in 2007, Huang started the e-commerce site Oku. He sold it for $2.2m in 2010. In October, he ranked seventh on the 2019 Huron Report. In March, he ranked second in the 2020 Huron Global Young Zhuang Sect Self-Made Rich List. In November, he was named to the 2021 Forbes Rich List of Mainland China, ranking sixth with a wealth of ¥213.2 billion.

Pinduoduo IPO 
Huang founded and led the Shanghai-based company Pinduoduo in 2015. Pinduoduo had a revenue of 1.4 billion yuan ($280 million) in 2017. In 2019, its revenue was $4.33 billion US dollars (30.14 billion RMB). It became publicly traded following an initial public offering in the United States in July 2018, raising $1.6 billion. After the public offering on NASDAQ, Huang's 47% stake in Pinduoduo was valued at $14 billion, making him the thirteenth richest person in China.

On July 1, 2020, Huang stepped down as CEO of Pinduoduo but continued as its chairman. On March 17, 2021, Huang stepped down as chairman and entrusted the voting rights of his shares to the Board. The company said Huang will pursue "new, long-term opportunities".

Philanthropy 
By June 2020, Huang reduced his Pinduoduo stake to 29.4% by donating 2.37% to a charitable foundation and 7.74% to the Pinduoduo Partnership. He also donated 2.37% to an irrevocable charity to promote social responsibility development and scientific research. Huang was named the leading philanthropist on the Hurun Philanthropy List in 2021 after pledging billions for social responsibility projects and scientific research.

According to Bloomberg, Huang and the Pinduoduo founding team have donated 100 million (2.37% of Pinduoduo shares) to the Starry Night Charitable Trust to "support fundamental research in biomedical science, agriculture, and food."

See also 

 Duan Yongping
 Jack Ma
 Yiming Zhang

Notes 

 In this Chinese name, the family name is Huang.

References

External links 
 The letter to the shareholders at Pinduoduo
 Colin Huang on Wechat
 Colin Huang on Forbes

Living people
21st-century Chinese businesspeople
Billionaires from Zhejiang
Businesspeople from Hangzhou
Businesspeople in online retailing
Chinese chief executives
Chinese company founders
Chinese computer businesspeople
Chinese software engineers
Chinese technology company founders
Google people
University of Wisconsin–Madison College of Letters and Science alumni
Zhejiang University alumni
1980 births